Henry "Harry" Uzzell (6 January 1883 – 20 December 1960) was a Welsh international rugby union player. He played club rugby predominantly for Newport and played county rugby for Gloucestershire. A fruiterer by trade he later became landlord of the Tredegar Arms in Bassaleg.

Uzzell spent the majority of his rugby career with Newport and captained them during the 1913/14 season. In 1912 he was part of the Swansea team that beat the touring South Africans.

International career
Uzzell made his debut for Wales on 20 January 1912 against England. He would represent his country on 15 occasions in total, captaining his country four times. In one game against France at St Helen's, Swansea, Uzzell scored two tries the only points he collected for his country. It is probably true that Uzzell would have been capped far more but for the intervention of the First World War.

International games played
Wales
  1912, 1914, 1920
  1912, 1913, 1914, 1920
  1912, 1913, 1914, 1920
  1912, 1913, 1914, 1920

Bibliography

References

1883 births
1960 deaths
English rugby union players
London Welsh RFC players
Newport RFC players
People from Shirehampton
Rugby union hookers
Rugby union players from Bristol
Tredegar RFC players
Wales international rugby union players
Wales rugby union captains